is a former Japanese football player.

He has the dubious distinction of having been relegated with four clubs in five years from 2007-2011 (Yokohama FC, Tokyo Verdy, JEF United Chiba and Avispa Fukuoka).

Club statistics

References

External links

1981 births
Living people
Nihon University alumni
Association football people from Shizuoka Prefecture
Japanese footballers
J1 League players
J2 League players
Shimizu S-Pulse players
Yokohama FC players
Tokyo Verdy players
JEF United Chiba players
Avispa Fukuoka players
Association football defenders